David Oh (born March 8, 1960) is an American attorney and politician. He served as a Republican member of the Philadelphia City Council from 2012 to 2023. He was the first Asian American elected to the city council.

Early life and education
Oh was born in Philadelphia on March 8, 1960. He grew up in Cobbs Creek. His father, Ki Hang Oh, was a pastor.

Oh graduated from Dickinson College and Rutgers Law School. He became a member of the Pennsylvania Bar Association in 1985.

Career
After graduating from law school, Oh worked for three years as an Assistant District Attorney in Philadelphia. He resigned to join the U.S. Army in 1988 and served until 1992 as a 2nd lieutenant in the Army National Guard. He returned to Philadelphia and opened a solo law firm. In 2008, he merged his firm with  Zarwin Baum DeVito Kaplan Schaer Toddy, P.C.

Prior to running for office, Oh worked for Mayor Ed Rendell's transition team as well as on Governor Tom Ridge's trade mission to South Korea.

Philadelphia City Council

In 2003 and 2007, Oh ran unsuccessful campaigns to win one of the two minority party at-large seats for the Philadelphia City Council. In both elections, he was defeated by Jack Kelly and Frank Rizzo Jr.

In 2011, Kelly did not run for reelection and Rizzo was defeated in the Republican primary. In the general election, state representative Denny O'Brien received the most votes for Republican candidates to take one of the at-large seats, and Oh narrowly defeated former mayoral candidate Al Taubenberger for the final seat. Oh was the first Asian American to be elected to the city council. After his election, he was selected as minority whip.

Oh was reelected to the council in 2015. During the primary campaign for his reelection, he took an illegal $20,000 campaign donation while advising the donor how to avoid campaign finance laws. He returned the money and was fined $2,000 for the violation. In addition, Oh had three of his city employees fined for working on his reelection campaign while on city time. After an investigation by the Philadelphia Board of Ethics, the employees were fined a combined $3,300. Although council employees are prohibited from any political fundraising, many of the violations involved working on fundraising events for Oh.

In 2015, Oh helped raise money for a statue to commemorate William "Wild Bill" Guarnere, who was a World War II veteran.

In 2016, Oh organized the first annual First Responder Appreciation Day, which honors police, firefighters, and paramedic units. He also traveled to South Korea to discuss investment opportunities in Philadelphia with representatives of the South Korean government and business sectors. He had previously hosted South Korean officials in 2012 in an effort to "promote Philadelphia as a globally competitive city."

In 2017, Oh introduced a resolution to honor Philadelphia native Kevin Hart by designating July 6, 2017, as "Kevin Hart Day" in Philadelphia. Hundreds of people, including Hart, attended the celebration, which included a mural dedication at Max's Steaks in North Philadelphia.

In 2023, Oh resigned from the city council to run for Mayor of Philadelphia.

Military service controversy
During the 2011 campaign, the Philadelphia Daily News reported that Oh had falsely claimed to have served as a Green Beret in the U.S. Army Special Forces during his three campaigns for city council. Oh responded that he did wear a green beret in the Special Forces Group of the Maryland National Guard but did not complete full Special Forces training. After facing criticism from veterans, he apologized for overstating his military credentials.

Personal life
Oh lives in Southwest Philadelphia with his wife, Heesun, and their four children.

In the 1990s, Oh was arrested on gun charges and was found not guilty in a non-jury trial in 1995.

On May 31, 2017, Oh was stabbed in an attempted robbery outside his home while unloading groceries from his car. He underwent emergency surgery at Penn Presbyterian Medical Center. A 24-year-old African American man was identified by Oh in a photo lineup and charged with attempted murder. After 10 months in jail, the man was found not guilty due to a lack of evidence to corroborate Oh's testimony.

See also
List of members of Philadelphia City Council since 1952

References

External links
Official city council website
Official campaign website

1960 births
American military personnel of Korean descent
American politicians of Korean descent
Dickinson College alumni
Living people
Pennsylvania lawyers
Pennsylvania Republicans
Philadelphia City Council members
Rutgers School of Law–Camden alumni
Stabbing survivors
United States Army officers
Asian-American city council members
Asian-American people in Pennsylvania politics
Asian conservatism in the United States